Haemonais is a genus of annelids belonging to the family Naididae.

Species:
 Haemonais waldvogeli  Bretscher, 1900 
 Haemonais laurentii Stephenson, 1915, accepted as Haemonais waldvogeli Bretscher, 1900

References

Naididae